The 1985 Bowling Green Falcons football team was an American football team that represented Bowling Green University in the Mid-American Conference (MAC) during the 1985 NCAA Division I-A football season. In their ninth season under head coach Denny Stolz, the Falcons compiled an 11–1 record (9–0 against MAC opponents), won the MAC championship, lost to Fresno State by a 51–7 score in the 1985 California Bowl, and outscored their opponents by a combined total of 355 to 223.

The team's statistical leaders included Brian McClure with 2,674 passing yards, Bernard White with 949 rushing yards, and Stan Hunter with 761 receiving yards.

Schedule

References

Bowling Green
Bowling Green Falcons football seasons
Mid-American Conference football champion seasons
Bowling Green Falcons football